The 2009–10 Bosnia and Herzegovina Hockey League season was the second season of the Bosnia and Herzegovina Hockey League (BHL), after a 6-year hiatus. HK Stari Grad defeated HK Bosna in the best of three final series two games to one, winning the championship.

League business
For the 2009–10 season all games will be played at the Olympic Hall Zetra. The league employs modified rules. Games last for 45 minutes without a stopping clock, and contact is not allowed. The season opened with the three teams with only one, HK Bosna, returning from the previous season. The two new teams are HK Stari Grad and HK Alfa who were founded in 2002 and 2003 respectively. Each played ten games before the top two teams enter the three game playoffs.

The three teams were given nicknames to play under for the season. HK Bosna plays under the name Lisice sa Općine Centar, HK Alfa plays under the name Medvjedi iz Novog Sarajeva, and HK Stari Grad plays under the name Vukovi sa Starog Grada.

Regular season

Standings

Fixtures

Playoffs
HK Bosna and HK Stari Grad qualified for the playoffs after finishing first and second in the regular season standings respectively. HK Stari Grad won the best of three championship series, two games to one.

References

External links
Bosnia and Herzegovina Ice Hockey Federation 

Bosnia and Herzegovina Hockey League seasons
Bosnia And Herzegovina Hockey League Season
2009–10 in Bosnia and Herzegovina ice hockey